Michael Ciochetti Jr. (born April 23, 1959) is an American stock car racing driver and aviation entrepreneur. He is a former competitor in the ARCA Racing Series, and planned to compete in the NASCAR Winston Cup Series before suffering a career-ending injury.

Racing career
Mike Ciochetti Jr. began his racing career in South Florida in the mid 1970s racing at both Hialeah Speedway and the South Florida Fairgrounds Speedway in West Palm Beach. In the early 1980s he competed on the NASCAR All Pro Series traveling circuit throughout the Southeastern U.S.  In 1992 he worked as a mechanic on Alan Kulwicki's 1992 Winston Cup Championship-winning team.  Following Kulwicki's death in a 1993 plane crash, Ciochetti transitioned to Precision Products Racing and driver Rick Mast where he worked for the 1994 season before resuming his own career as a driver on the ARCA Racing Series.

Between 1996 and 1999, Ciochetti competed in 41 ARCA Racing Series races, posting a best finish of third twice in 1998, at Charlotte Motor Speedway and Texas Motor Speedway. In 1998 he attempted to make his debut in the NASCAR Winston Cup Series, driving the No. 80 Hover Motorsports Ford in qualifying for the 1998 Daytona 500, but he failed to make the race due to an accident on the final lap of the Twin 125-mile qualifying race. He won one pole in the ARCA series, at Pocono Raceway in 1998. Towards the end of the 1999 season, Ciochetti signed a deal to drive for Cale Yarborough Motorsports and run for NASCAR Winston Cup Rookie of the Year in the 2000 season; planning to run the No. 39, the team planned to make its debut in the season-ending race of the 1999 NASCAR Winston Cup Series season at Homestead-Miami Speedway. However shortly after the announcement, Ciochetti's shoulder was broken in an ARCA crash at Talladega Superspeedway; the injury forced him to undergo multiple surgeries, and sidelined his racing career. Ciochetti would return for one final ARCA race, at Talladega in 2007 driving for K-Automotive Motorsports, where he was very competitive, running as high as 6th, but finished 39th after blowing a tire in the late laps of the race.  Mike Ciochetti Jr. is now the developer of a "Fly-In Community" named Heaven's Landing which is located just outside of Clayton, Georgia.  He is an avid pilot with a continued interest in NASCAR.

Aviation career
A long-time flyer, following his injury Ciochetti developed property he owned in northern Georgia as Heaven's Landing, a fly-in community. Ciochetti is also active with the Liberty Foundation, maintaining the Boeing B-17 Flying Fortress bomber Liberty Belle.

Motorsports career results

NASCAR
(key) (Bold - Pole position awarded by qualifying time. Italics - Pole position earned by points standings or practice time. * – Most laps led.)

Winston Cup Series

References
Citations

Bibliography

Brown, Mike. "Flyer of the Month: Five Aces: Mike Ciochetti's Winning Hand at Heaven's Landing". Aero Trader. Volume 32, Issue 2: February 2008. Accessed 2014-04-18.

External links

Living people
1959 births
People from Clayton, Georgia
Racing drivers from Georgia (U.S. state)
ARCA Menards Series drivers
NASCAR drivers